The Barra MacNeils are a Canadian musical group from Sydney Mines, Nova Scotia.  The founding members of the group are siblings Sheumas, Kyle, Stewart, and Lucy MacNeil.  In 2005, two additional brothers, Ryan and Boyd, joined the band. The Scottish island of Barra is the ancestral home of Clan MacNeil.

Musical career
The MacNeil siblings are from Cape Breton Island and began performing together in 1980 while still teenagers (Lucy MacNeil being only 10 years old). Consequently, they were only able to perform on weekends, and toured during school holidays. The siblings are classically trained musicians and alumni of Mount Allison University. (Sheumas '84, Kyle '85, Stewart '87, and Lucy '91)

In 1986, they released their first eponymous album on their own independent label. The Barra MacNeils won their first East Coast Music Award in 1991, and have won four more since, including a Juno Award for Album of the Year for TimeFrame in 1992, and a Group of the Year award in 2001. They signed with PolyGram, and their first two albums were re-released while their 1993 album Closer To Paradise earned a gold record. They have been an opening act for Céline Dion and have toured regularly across North America and Europe.

Discography

Albums

Singles

References

External links
Barra MacNeils www.barramacneils.com
 Entry at canadianbands.com
 
 
 Entry at thecanadianencyclopedia.ca

Musical groups from Nova Scotia
Canadian folk music groups
Musical groups established in 1980
Canadian Celtic music